Rompicherla may refer to:

Rompicherla, Chittoor district, a village in the Chittoor district, Andhra Pradesh, India
Rompicherla, Guntur district,  a village in the Guntur district, Andhra Pradesh, India